Agbado may refer to some places in Africa:

Benin
Agbado, Benin, a village in Collines Department

Nigeria
Agbado, Ekiti, a village in Ekiti State
Agbado, Kogi (or Agbedde), a village in Kogi State 
Agbado-Oke Odo, a Local Council of Ifako-Ijaiye, a suburban city-district of Lagos
Agbadi, a village in Benue State